Olimpiada (meaning Olympics) is a Slavic feminine given name. Notable people with the name include:

 Olimpiada Bodiu (1912–1971), Bessarabian anti-Soviet activist
 Olimpiada Ivanova (born 1970), Russian race walker
 Olimpiada Kozlova (1906–1986), Soviet economist

Feminine given names